Melkite Greek Catholic Archeparchy of Sidon (in Latin: Archeparchia Sidoniensis Graecorum Melkitarum) is a diocese of the Melkite Greek Catholic Church suffragan of the Melkite Greek Catholic Archeparchy of Tyre. In 2010 there were 32,000 baptized. It is currently governed by Archeparch Elie Bechara Haddad, BS.

Territory and statistics

The archeparchy extends its jurisdiction over the Melkite Greek faithful of Sidon District and Chouf District in Lebanon. Its archeparchial seat is the city of Sidon, where is located the cathedral of Saint Nicholas.

The territory is divided into 53 parishes and had 32,000 Melkite Catholics in 2010.

History

Sidon was the site of an ancient Christian community, dating back to the dawn of Christianity. The historical and Christian origins of Sidon dates back to the New Testament, in the Gospel of Matthew (Mt 15: 21–28) reports: "From there, Jesus withdrew to the region of Tyre and Sidon" and in the Gospel of Mark (Mk 7, 31) states: "Jesus left the region of Tyre, and came through Sidon to the Sea of Galilee midst of the coasts of Decapolis". On the arrest and imprisonment of Paul, in the Acts of the Apostles (Acts 27.3): "The next day we touched at Sidon, and Julius treated Paul the benevolent, allowed him to go to his friends and to seek care." However, the presence of a bishop is historically attested for the first time at the First Council of Nicaea of 325. In Roman crusade was the seat of a diocese of the Latin Rite.

Only from 770 was recovered the life of the Sidon Christian community. With the conquest of the last Crusader bastion in Acre by the Mamelukes in 1291, the Christian community in Sidon largely was vanished from there. The reconstruction of the Christian communities in and around Sidon began again until 1604 with the election of Ignatius Houtiyeh as bishop of Tyre and Sidon.

During the Catholic missionary work since the end of the 16th century some individual Melkite Orthodox priests were converted to the Latin rite. They converted to the Catholic faith Euthymius II Karmah (died in 1635) whom was ordained in 1634 Melkite Patriarch of Antioch united with Catholic Church.

The Eparchy of Sidon started in 1683 with its Melkite bishops in communion with Rome. First Catholic eparch was Efthymios Saïfi, founder of Basilian Salvatorian Order.

Initially it was united with the archeparchy of Tyre; the two locations were separated in the mid-eighteenth century (in 1752 approximately). Tyre became an archeparchy and Sidon an eparchy.

On 18 November 1964 the eparchy was elevated to the rank of archeparchy by Pope Paul VI.

On 27 January 2007, the pope gave his assent to the Elie Haddad's election, canonically made by the Synod of the Melkite Greek Catholic Church on 11 October 2006, to Archbishop of Sidon to the Melkites.

Bishops

 Euthymios Michael Saifi (1683 - October 8, 1723 deceased)
 Ignatius El Beyrouthy (1724 - 1752 resigned)
 Basilios Jelghaf (1755 - July 23, 1764 appointed prefect of Beirut)
 Michel Jawhar, BS (1764 - March 30, 1789 confirmed Melkite Patriarch of Antioch)
 Vacant (1789-1795)
 Agapius II Matar, BS (1795 - July 24, 1797 confirmed Melkite Patriarch of Antioch)
 Gabriel Matar, BS (1800 - August 14, 1813 elected Melkite Patriarch of Antioch)
 Vacant (1813-1822)
 Helias (Basilios) Khalil (2 February 1822 consecrated - 1836 deceased)
 Theodosius Kuyumji (20 December 1836 consecrated - 1886 deceased)
 Basil Haggiar, BS (June 16, 1887 - February 16, 1916 deceased)
 Athanasius Khoriaty, BS (March 14, 1920 - January 24, 1931 deceased)
 Gabriel (Nicholas) Nabaa, BS (November 22, 1931 - December 15, 1946 deceased)

Archbishops

 Basile Khoury (March 15, 1947 - August 25, 1977 withdrawn)
 Michel Hakim, BS (August 25, 1977 - October 13, 1980 appointed Apostolic Exarch of Canada)
 Ignace Raad (September 9, 1981 - September 18, 1985 resigned)
 Georges Kwaïter, BS (23 July 1987 - 2006 withdrawn)
 Elie Bechara Haddad, BS (from 11 October 2006)

References

External links
 http://www.catholic-hierarchy.org/diocese/dsdme.html
 http://www.notredamedemantara.org/french/index.htm
 http://www.newadvent.org/cathen/13776a.htm
 http://www.pgc-lb.org/fre/melkite_greek_catholic_church/Archieparchie-de-Saida-et-Deir-el-Kamar-Liban

Melkite Greek Catholic Church in Lebanon
Melkite Greek Catholic eparchies
Sidon District